Saleem or Salim Ali may refer to:

 Saleem Ali (politician) (died 2007), Maldivian politician
 Saleem Ali (academic) (born 1973), American academic of Pakistani origin
 Salim Ali (1896–1987), ornithologist, author and conservationist
 Salim Rubai Ali (1935–1978), second President of the People's Democratic Republic of Yemen
 Salim Ali (coach) Soccer coach and former Mathare United player of Kenyan origin.